Eucalyptus extrica, commonly known as eastern tallerack, is a species of mallee that is endemic to Western Australia. It has smooth bark, lance-shaped adult leaves arranged in opposite pairs, flower buds in groups of three, whitish flowers and cylindrical to barrel-shaped fruit.

Description
It has smooth light grey over brown bark, sometimes with rough, fibrous or ribbony bark on the lower stems. Young plants and coppice regrowth have slightly glaucous, elliptical to egg-shaped leaves arranged in opposite pairs. Flowering occurs between January and April and the flowers are whitish.

Tallerack (E. pleurocarpa) has a similar habit but has noticeably shorter, wider, glaucous leaves, glaucous buds and fruit. Intergrades between the two species have been recorded.

Taxonomy and naming
Eucalyptus extrica was first formally described in 2000 by Dean Nicolle from a specimen collected east of Condingup by Anthony Orchard, and the description was published in the journal Nuytsia. Nicolle wrote that the specific epithet is "from the Latin word extrico meaning "disentangled" or "free", in reference to this species having been confused with E. tetragona in the past. Ali Sharr wrote that extrica is a non-word in Latin, and that the past participle of the Latin extrico ("I disentangle" or "I free") is extricatus.

Distribution and habitat
Eastern tallerack  is found in coastal areas in the Goldfields-Esperance region of Western Australia between Esperance and Cape Arid where it grows in sandy soils over limestone.

Conservation status
This mallee is classified as "not threatened" by the Western Australian Government Department of Parks and Wildlife.

See also
List of Eucalyptus species

References

extrica
Endemic flora of Western Australia
Mallees (habit)
Myrtales of Australia
Eucalypts of Western Australia
Plants described in 2000